The Railway Series is a series of British books about a railway known as the North Western Railway, located on the fictional Island of Sodor. There are 42 books in the series, the first published in May 1945 by the Rev. Wilbert Awdry. Twenty-five more books were written by Awdry, the final one being written in October 1972. Sixteen more were written by his son, Christopher Awdry, between September 1983 and July 2011. The series features many anthropomorphic vehicles, including Thomas the Tank Engine. Thomas became the most popular and famous character in the series and the titular character of the television series Thomas & Friends from 1984 to 2021. Many characters and stories from the books formed the basis of the children's television series.

Nearly all of The Railway Series stories were based on real-life events. As a lifelong railway enthusiast, Awdry was keen that his stories should be as realistic as possible. The engine characters were mostly based upon real classes of locomotive, and some of the railways themselves were based upon real lines in the British Isles.

Audio adaptations of The Railway Series have been recorded at various times under the title The Railway Stories.

Origins
The stories began in 1942, when Christopher Awdry, at the age of two, had measles and was confined to a darkened room. His father told him stories and rhymes to cheer him up. One of Christopher's favourite rhymes was:
Early in the morning,
Down at the station,
All the little engines
Standing in a row.

Along comes the driver,
Pulls the little lever
Puff, puff! Chuff, chuff!
Off we go!

The origins of this rhyme are unknown, but research by Brian Sibley suggests that it originated at some point prior to the First World War. The words, with some slight alterations, were later set to music by Lee Ricks and Slim Gaillard in 1948, and released by Tommy Dorsey and his orchestra as a single entitled "Down by the Station". Wilbert Awdry's answers to Christopher's questions about the rhyme led to the creation of a short story, "Edward's Day Out", featuring Edward the Blue Engine, an old engine who is allowed out of the shed for a day. Another story about Edward followed, this time featuring Gordon the Big Engine, named after a child living on the same road who Christopher considered rather bossy.

A third story had its origins in a limerick of which Christopher was fond, and which Awdry used to introduce The Sad Story of Henry:

Once, an engine attached to a train
Was afraid of a few drops of rain
It went into a tunnel,
And squeaked through its funnel
And never came out again.

As with the previous rhyme, the origins of this are uncertain, but Awdry received a letter telling him that a similar poem had appeared in a book of children's rhymes, published in 1902:Once an engine when fixed to a train
Was alarmed at a few drops of rain,
So went "puff" from its funnel
Then fled to a tunnel,
And would not come out again.

This story introduced the popular characters Henry the Green Engine and the Fat Director. Encouraged by his wife Margaret, Awdry submitted the three stories to Edmund Ward in 1943. The head of the children's books division requested a fourth story to bring the three engines together and redeem Henry, who had been bricked up in a tunnel in the previous story. Although Wilbert had not intended that the three engines live on the same railway, he complied with the request in the story Edward, Gordon and Henry. The four stories were published in 1945 as a single volume, The Three Railway Engines, illustrated by William Middleton.

Christmas 1942 saw the genesis of the character that grew to become the most famous fictional locomotive in the world. Awdry constructed a toy tank engine for Christopher, which gained the name Thomas. Stories about Thomas were requested by Christopher, and 1946 saw the publication of Thomas the Tank Engine. This was illustrated by Reginald Payne, whom Wilbert felt to be a great improvement over Middleton. Like its predecessor, this book was a success and Awdry was asked to write stories about James, a character who first appeared in Thomas and the Breakdown Train, the final story in Thomas the Tank Engine. The book James the Red Engine appeared in 1948, the year in which the railways in Britain were nationalised, and from this point onwards the Fat Director was known by his familiar title of the Fat Controller.

James the Red Engine was notable as the first book to be illustrated by C. Reginald Dalby, perhaps the most famous of the Railway Series artists, and certainly the most controversial due to the criticism later aimed at him by Awdry.  Dalby illustrated every volume up to Percy the Small Engine (1956), and also produced new illustrations for The Three Railway Engines and made changes to those of Thomas the Tank Engine.

Successive books would introduce such popular characters as Annie and Clarabel, Percy the Small Engine and Toby the Tram Engine.

In making the stories as real as possible, Awdry took a lot of inspiration from a number of sources in his extensive library and found the Railway Gazettes "Scrapheap" column particularly useful as a source of unusual railway incidents that were recreated for The Railway Series characters.

Awdry continued working on The Railway Series until 1972, when Tramway Engines (book 26 in the series) was published. However, he had been finding it increasingly difficult to come up with ideas for new stories, and after this he felt that "the well had run dry" and so decided that the time had come to retire. He wrote no further Railway Series volumes, but later wrote a spin-off story (Thomas's Christmas Party) for the television series, and expanded versions of some of his earlier stories, as well as writing The Island of Sodor: Its People, History and Railways. In addition, he wrote a number of short stories and articles for Thomas the Tank Engine Annuals.

Cultural context 
Anthropomorphisation of locomotives has a literary tradition extending back at least as far as the writings of Rudyard Kipling in his 1897 story ".007".

Continuing series under Christopher Awdry

Christopher Awdry was a keen railway enthusiast like his father. On a visit to the Nene Valley Railway he was inspired to write his first story Triple Header based on a railwayman's account of a locomotive running out of steam short of its destination. In the story, Thomas, Percy and Duck take on Gordon's Express but find it more than they can handle. Christopher wrote three further stories, Stop Thief!, Mind That Bike and Fish and showed them to his father, who encouraged Christopher to submit them for publication. At the time, work on the television adaptation was underway, and Kaye and Ward were keen to revive The Railway Series. The book Really Useful Engines was published in 1983. Wilbert had considered this title for his own 27th volume before abandoning the project.

Christopher wrote another thirteen books, including the 50th anniversary volume Thomas and the Fat Controller's Engines. He also wrote stories for the television series, notably More About Thomas the Tank Engine, The Railway Series 30th volume.

The success of the television series led to tensions between Christopher and the publishers. Thomas was the central character of the television series and the publishers wanted stories focused on Thomas. Christopher produced Thomas and the Fat Controller's Engines that had one story about Thomas, while Thomas Comes Home did not feature Thomas until the last page.

The series' 40th volume, New Little Engine, was published in 1996. Egmont Publishing who had taken over from Kay and Ward, did not publish further Railway Series books and allowed the existing back catalogue to go out of print. There was a selected print run in 2004 of the original 26 books, but in 2005, the sixtieth anniversary of Wilbert's first book, the Awdry family were disappointed that not all of the stories were available in their original format.

In 2005 Christopher published Sodor: Reading Between the Lines under his own imprint Sodor Enterprises. This book expanded the fictional world of Sodor. He published several more books, mostly set on real railways in Britain. In 2006, Egmont started to re-publish Wilbert's books in their original format. The fourteen books written by Christopher were re-released in August 2007. On 3 September 2007, Christopher published the 41st book in the series, Thomas and Victoria, illustrated by Clive Spong. The book addresses issues relating to the railway preservation movement.

In July 2011, Egmont released the 42nd book in the series: Thomas and his Friends. The final story ended with the words "The End".

Christopher Awdry said that he had other material, which he hoped would be published. He narrated new stories about the narrow-gauge engines on "Duncan Days" at the Talyllyn Railway in Wales.

Illustrators
The Railway Series is perhaps as highly regarded for its illustrations as for its writing, which in the immediate post-Second World War era were seen as uniquely vivid and colourful. Indeed, some critics (notably Miles Kington) have claimed that the quality of the illustrations outshines that of the writing.

The first edition of The Three Railway Engines was illustrated by the artist William Middleton, with whom Awdry was deeply dissatisfied. The second artist to work on the series was Reginald Payne, who illustrated Thomas the Tank Engine in a far more realistic style. Despite an early disagreement as to how Thomas should look, Awdry was ultimately pleased with the pictures produced.

Payne later suffered a nervous breakdown and proved impossible to contact to illustrate James the Red Engine, so C. Reginald Dalby was hired. Dalby also illustrated the next eight books in the series. The Three Railway Engines was reprinted with Dalby's artwork replacing William Middleton's and Dalby also touched up Payne's artwork in the second book. Dalby's work on the series proved popular with readers, but not with the author, who repeatedly clashed with him over issues of accuracy and consistency. Dalby resigned from the series in 1956, following an argument over the portrayal of Percy the Small Engine in the book of the same name. Awdry had built a model of Percy as a reference for the artist but Dalby did not make use of it. Despite the tempestuous relationship with Awdry, Dalby is probably the best remembered of the series' artists.

With The Eight Famous Engines (1957), John T. Kenney took over the illustration of the series. His style was less colourful but more realistic than Dalby's. Kenney made use of Awdry's model engines as a reference. As a result of his commitment to realism and technical accuracy, he enjoyed a far more comfortable working relationship with Awdry, which lasted until Gallant Old Engine (1962), when Kenney's eyesight began to deteriorate.

The artist initially chosen to replace him was the Swedish artist Gunvor Edwards. She began illustrating Stepney the "Bluebell" Engine, but felt unsuited to the work. She was assisted for that volume by her husband Peter, who effectively took over from then on. Both artists retained credit for the work, and the "Edwards era" lasted until Wilbert Awdry's last volume, Tramway Engines. The style used in these volumes was still essentially realistic but had something of an impressionistic feel.

When Christopher Awdry took over as author of the series in 1983, the publisher was keen to find an illustrator who would provide work that had the gem-like appeal of Dalby's pictures, but also had the realism of Kenney and Edwards' artwork. The artist chosen was Clive Spong. He illustrated all of Christopher Awdry's books, a greater number than any other artist working on The Railway Series. He also produced illustrations for a number of spin-off stories written by the Awdrys, and his artwork was used in The Island of Sodor: Its People, History and Railways.

Format and presentation
The books were produced in an unusual landscape format. Each one was around sixty pages long, thirty of which would be text and thirty illustrations. This format, coupled with the smaller size of each book, makes them attractive to small children. The books were each divided into four stories (with the exception of Henry the Green Engine, which was divided into five).

Each book from Thomas the Tank Engine onwards opened with a foreword. This would act as a brief introduction to the book, its characters or its themes. They were written as a letter, usually to the readers (addressed as "Dear Friends") but sometimes to individual children who had played some part in the story's creation. The foreword to Thomas the Tank Engine was a letter to Christopher Awdry. This section would often advertise real railways or acknowledge the assistance of people or organisations. The foreword to The Little Old Engine is unique in acknowledging the fact that Skarloey (and, by implication, the entirety of The Railway Series) is fictional.

The unusual shape of the books made them instantly recognisable. However, it did prompt complaints from booksellers that they were difficult to display, and even that they could easily be shoplifted. Nonetheless, the format was imitated by publishers Ian Allan for their Sammy the Shunter and Chuffalong books.

Unusually for children's books of the austerity period, The Railway Series was printed in full colour from the start, which is cited by many critics as one of its major selling points in the early days.

Sodor

The Rev. W. Awdry received numerous letters from young fans asking questions about the engines and their railway, as well as letters concerning inconsistencies within the stories. In an effort to answer these, he began to develop a specific setting for the books. On a visit to the Isle of Man, he discovered that the bishop there is known as the Bishop of Sodor and Man. The "Sodor" part of the title comes from the Sudreys, but Awdry decided that a fictional island between the Isle of Man and England by that name would be an ideal setting for his stories.

In partnership with his brother George (the librarian of the National Liberal Club), he gradually devised Sodor's history, geography, language, industries and even geology. The results were published in the book The Island of Sodor: Its People, History and Railways in 1987.

Cameo appearances
The Awdrys both wrote about Sodor as if it were a real place that they visited, and that the stories were obtained first-hand. This was often "documented" in the foreword to each book. In some of W. Awdry's later books he appeared as the Thin Clergyman and was described as a writer, though his name and connections to the series were never made explicit. He was invariably accompanied by the Fat Clergyman, based on the Rev. Teddy Boston, who was a fellow railway enthusiast and close friend. The two Clergymen were portrayed as railway enthusiasts, and were responsible for annoying the Small Engines and discovering Duke the Lost Engine. They were often figures of fun, liable to be splashed with water or to fall through a roof.

Awdry also appeared in a number of illustrations, usually as a joke on the part of the illustrator. In one illustration by John T. Kenney in Duck and the Diesel Engine he appears with a figure who bears a strong resemblance to C. Reginald Dalby, which Brian Sibley has suggested might be a dig at Dalby's inaccurate rendition of the character of Duck. A vicar appears in Edward the Blue Engine and other volumes as the owner of Trevor the Traction Engine. This may be a reference to Teddy Boston, who had himself saved a traction engine from scrap.

Dalby illustrated the entire Awdry family – Wilbert, Margaret, Christopher, Veronica and Hilary – watching Percy pass through a station ("Percy runs away" in Troublesome Engines (p53)). This was Christopher Awdry's only appearance in an illustration, but he often described meetings with the engines in the book forewords, usually with some degree of humour.

Other people associated with The Railway Series were also referenced. In Dalby's books, he made allusions to himself twice on store signs (Seen in Off the Rails and Saved from Scrap) and a reference to E.T.L. Marriott, who edited The Railway Series, in Percy Takes the Plunge on a "Ship Chandlers" company sign. Peter Edwards also notes that he based Gordon's face on Eric Marriot's.

The Fat Controller (originally The Fat Director in the earliest books which pre-dated the nationalisation of Britain's railways in 1948) was a fictional character. The Thin Controller, in charge of the narrow-gauge trains in the books was based on Mr Edward Thomas, the manager of the Talyllyn Railway in its last years before enthusiasts took it over in 1951.

A number of the stories are based on articles which appeared in railway enthusiast publications of the period. The monthly Railway Magazine was a long-running enthusiasts' companion and the origins of several stories can be recognised. The railway books written by C. Hamilton Ellis, were another source.

British Railways: The Other Railway
Developments on British Railways were often mirrored, satirised and even attacked in The Railway Series. The book Troublesome Engines (1950), for example, dealt with industrial disputes on British Railways. As the series went on, comparisons with the real railways of Britain became more explicit, with engines and locations of British Railways (always known as "The Other Railway") making appearances in major or cameo roles.

The most obvious theme relating to British Railways was the decline of steam locomotion and its replacement with diesels. The first real instance of this was in the book Duck and the Diesel Engine (1958) in which an unpleasant Diesel shunter arrives, causes trouble and is sent away. This theme may have been visited again in The Twin Engines (1960), in which an engine is ordered from Scotland, and two arrive (Donald and Douglas), implying the other went to Sodor with his brother to avoid being scrapped. The 1963 volume Stepney the "Bluebell" Engine explained that steam engines were actually being scrapped to make way for these diesels, and again featured a diesel getting his comeuppance. The book Enterprising Engines was published in 1968, the year when steam finally disappeared from British Railways, and was the most aggressive towards dieselisation and Dr Beeching's modernisation plan. It features yet another arrogant diesel who is sent away, an additional one who stays on the Island of Sodor, a visit by the real Flying Scotsman locomotive, a steam engine, Oliver, making a daring escape to Sodor, and Sir Topham Hatt making a declaration that the steam engines of his railway will still be in service.

Thereafter, the books were less critical towards British Rail. Indeed, by the time of Christopher Awdry's 1984 book James and the Diesel Engines, the series was acknowledging that diesels could, in fact, be useful.

Preservation movement
W. Awdry used the books to promote steam railways in the United Kingdom. The Skarloey Railway was based on the Talyllyn Railway in Wales, where Awdry volunteered. The Skarloey books included a promotion for the Talyllyn Railway, either in the stories themselves, or in a footnote or the foreword. Many illustrations in the books depict recognisable locations on the Talyllyn Railway, and incidents and mishaps recorded by Tom Rolt in his book Railway Adventure were adapted for Skarloey stories.

From the 1980s onwards, the Awdrys permitted the Talyllyn Railway to repaint one of their engines in the guise of its Skarloey Railway "twin". The first engine to receive this treatment was No. 3, Sir Haydn, repainted to resemble the character Sir Handel. The second was No. 4, Edward Thomas, which became Peter Sam. In 2006 No. 6, Douglas ran in the guise of Duncan. As well as paint schemes and names taken from the books' artwork, these locomotives are fitted with fibreglass "faces". These characters' appearances have been written into The Railway Series by Christopher Awdry in the form of visits by the fictional engines to the Talyllyn Railway.

Two other railways on Sodor are based on real railways: The Culdee Fell Railway (usually known as the Mountain Railway) is based on the Snowdon Mountain Railway, also in Wales, and the Arlesdale Railway is based on the Ravenglass and Eskdale Railway in Cumbria. Some other lines on Sodor are heavily inspired by real lines. The Mid Sodor Railway acknowledges the Ffestiniog and Corris Railway and the Little Western bears a resemblance to the South Devon Railway.

From Duck and the Diesel Engine onwards, a number of real engines and railways were explicitly featured. Flying Scotsman, City of Truro, Stepney and Wilbert were all real locomotives that appeared in The Railway Series, the latter two having books dedicated to them: Stepney the "Bluebell" Engine and Wilbert the Forest Engine. Wilbert's appearance was of particular significance as the locomotive was named in tribute to Wilbert Awdry, the president of the Dean Forest Railway at the time. Christopher Awdry wrote Wilbert the Forest Engine in gratitude.

In Thomas and the Great Railway Show (1991) Thomas visited the National Railway Museum in York, and several of the museum's locomotives were featured. At the end of this book, Thomas is made an honorary member of the National Collection. This was mirrored by the real-life inclusion of The Railway Series in the National Railway Museum's library of railway books in recognition of their influence on railway preservation.

Thomas and Victoria (2007) focuses on the rescue and restoration of a coach. Victoria was rescued by the Fat Controller from an orchard and restored at Crovan's Gate works. She then became part of the vintage train, working with Toby and Henrietta. The formation of a vintage train is based on the activities by the Furness Railway Trust.

Characters

The series has featured numerous characters, both railway-based and otherwise. Some of the more notable ones are:

 Thomas the Tank Engine 
 Edward the Blue Engine
 Henry the Green Engine
 Gordon the Big Engine
 James the Red Engine
 Percy the Small Engine
 Toby the Tram Engine
 Duck the Great Western Engine
 Donald and Douglas the Scottish Twin Engines
 Oliver the Western Engine
 Trevor the Traction Engine
 Annie and Clarabel, Thomas's coaches
 Bertie the Bus
 Terence the Tractor
 Harold the Helicopter
 The Fat Controller

Books

The following table lists the titles of all 42 books in The Railway Series.

References in popular culture
Satirical magazine Private Eye produced a book called Thomas the Privatised Tank Engine, written in the style of The Railway Series. The stories were strongly critical of private railway companies and the Government of John Major, and covered subjects such as the Channel Tunnel, London Underground, transport of radioactive waste and the perceived dangerous state of the railways.

Andrew Lloyd Webber wanted to produce a musical television series based on The Railway Series, but Awdry refused to give him the control he wanted. Lloyd Webber would go on to compose the 1984 musical Starlight Express, and create The Really Useful Group, a name inspired by the catchphrase "Really Useful Engines".

There have been three adaptations of the series produced. The first was an unsuccessful pilot in 1953, which was filmed live and had a number of technical errors. Around three decades later came the Thomas the Tank Engine and Friends series, which premiered in 1984 and concluded in 2021. This was followed by Thomas & Friends: All Engines Go!, a spin-off of the previous series which uses 2D animation and a more cartoonish style.

Notes

References

External links

  (in PDF).
 The Real Lives of Thomas the Tank Engine—documents real influences behind the series
 
 

 
British children's books
Series of children's books